Fletch Bizzel  is a theatre in Dortmund, North Rhine-Westphalia, Germany.

Theatres in North Rhine-Westphalia